This is a list of the longest walks that have occurred in groups and on solo or duo projects. Many have promoted social causes or medical conditions. Some have been done mostly for the experience.

Groups consist of three or more people who walked at least most of the entire distance. Solo/duo walks are one or two people. The difference is that the former is tougher to organise logistically, especially when crossing international borders, since there generally needs to be greater accommodations and more thorough approvals for a group. There is also a tougher process of decision making with even a small group than with one or two people. Some people walking in groups say that the walking part can be easier than dealing with group politics and dynamics.

The walks should be continuous, save for a few weeks to organise through other countries. There is a separate section for long runs and wheelchair expeditions that were not walks.

Longest group walks 
These were walks involving three or more long-distance participants.

A Walk of the People – A Pilgrimage for Life 
 Length: 
 Date: March 1984 – November 1985
 Miles walked per month: 
 Details: A Walk of the People – A Pilgrimage for Life called for an end to the Cold War with better relations between the U.S. and former Soviet Union. Walkers started at Point Conception, California, and went through Texas and the Deep South to New York City. A core group of eight flew to Dublin, Ireland, and walked to the border of the former East Germany. They obtained visas to Hungary and walked to that border before visiting several cities by train. Some walked to Geneva, Switzerland, then organised a trip to Moscow, Soviet Union, by train. The project attracted a wide range of support from across the political spectrum and was covered in the media by hundreds of newspapers and radio and television stations in those countries. It was the only walk from the U.S. to Moscow that went through the Deep South, Northern Ireland, and Hungary, so that added to the mileage.

Bethlehem Peace Pilgrimage 
 Length: 
 Date: April 1982 – December 1983
 Miles walked per month: 
 Details: This peace walk of about 20 core people started from Seattle and walked across the U.S. to Washington, D.C. Members then flew to Ireland and walked through much of Europe, taking a boat from Greece to the Middle East. The project ended in Bethlehem in the West Bank. It was led by Jesuit Fr. Jack Morris and Fr. George Zabelka, the pastor for the airmen who dropped the atomic bombs on Japan in 1945.

San Francisco to Moscow Walk for Peace 
 Length: 
 Date: December 1960 – October 1961
 Miles walked per month: 
 Details: Organised by the Committee for Non-Violent Action, about ten core people started from San Francisco and walked to New York in six months. Unlike numerous projects, they were able to walk through the Soviet Union, and the distance walked per month was significantly higher than most long group walks.

A Walk to Moscow
 Length: 
 Date: March 1981 – October 1983
 Miles walked per month: 
 Details: This peace walk started from Bangor, Washington to Boston. Members continued in the United Kingdom, walking to the border of the former East Germany. Some stayed in a village for nine months to negotiate for visas to walk in Czechoslovakia and Poland. Some then traveled to cities in the Soviet Union by train and tried to walk to Moscow but were stopped and sent back to Minsk.

World Peace Walk
 Length: 
 Date: April 1982 – August 1984
 Miles walked per month: 
 Details: Led by writer and activist C.B. Hall, participants walked from Seattle to New York and then across much of Europe. They were not allowed to walk in Eastern Europe but obtained visas to camp and meet people in East Germany for a few days. Some visited Moscow to meet with Soviet Peace Committee officials.

HikaNation 
 Length: 
 Date: April 1980 – May 1981
 Miles walked per month: 
 Details: HikaNation was a 14-month cross-country backpacking trip starting at Golden Gate Park in San Francisco, California on April 12, 1980, and ending at Cape Henlopen, Delaware on May 27, 1981, after traversing over 4,286 miles and passing through 14 states and Washington, D.C.

Interfaith Pilgrimage for Peace and Life
 Length: 
 Date: December 1994 – August 1995
 Miles walked per month: 
 Details: Led by Nipponzan-Myōhōji-Daisanga Japanese Buddhist monks, this walk started in Auschwitz, Poland, and ended in Nagasaki, Japan. More than 1,000 people from different nations joined at various times along the route that passed through war zones in Bosnia, as well as troubled parts of Israel, the West Bank, Jordan, Iraq, Cambodia, Vietnam and the Philippines.

Great March for Climate Action
 Length: 
 Date: March 2014 – November 2014
 Miles walked per month: 
 Details: Led by former Iowa state representative Ed Fallon, the Great March for Climate Action called attention to the need for a more substantive response to climate change. About 30 people hiked most of the distance.

The Longest Walk 
 Length: 
 Date: February 1978 – July 1978
 Miles walked per month: 
 Details: Several hundred Native Americans and supporters marched from Alcatraz Island in San Francisco to Washington, D.C., to affirm American Indians’ land and water rights. Some elders and organisers camped on the National Mall to end the Longest Walk. Similar projects were organised in 1980, 1984, 2008, 2011, 2013 and 2016.

United Souls of Awareness Walk 
 Length: 
 Date: April 2006 – April 2007
 Miles walked per month: 
 Details: Four musicians/artists in their 20s walked from Venice Beach, California to New York to encourage creative pursuits.

Alexander Gabyshev's Walk

 Length:  [forced to stop by authorities]
 Date: March 2019 – May 2020
 Miles walked per month: 
 Details: Alexander Gabyshev, a shaman, started walking from the Republic of Sakha in far east Russia with the goal of reaching Moscow some  later and performing a ritual to cause President Vladimir Putin to resign. He was joined by two other core walkers, and as many as 1,000 people greeted him during the first almost . In September 2019, Russian authorities detained him and sent him to a psychiatric hospital. In early 2020, authorities stopped his walk for the third time. He was committed to a Russian mental asylum by a court order in May 2020, a move criticised by officials from Amnesty International and other organisations.

Longest solo or duo walks 
These are walks done by one or two people. The length of some usually relates to the difficulties of securing access to walk in certain countries.

Jean Béliveau 
 Length: 
 Date: August 2000 – October 2011
 Miles walked per month: 
He met four Nobel Peace Prize winners, including Nelson Mandela in South Africa. His walk raised awareness for children who suffer from violence, with the start of the project coinciding with a similarly themed United Nations initiative. He pushed a three-wheeled stroller carrying food and supplies such as a tent and returned to Montreal to a welcome of several hundred people.

Peace Pilgrim 
 Length:  
 Date: January 1953 – July 1981
 Miles walked per month: 
 Details: Citing the need for a pilgrim to make a strong statement against militarism during the Korean War, Mildred Norman changed her name to Peace Pilgrim in 1953 and walked continuously back and forth across the U.S. She kept walking until her death in 1981, ironically in a car accident after she accepted a ride to a speaking engagement.

Ignacio Dean Mouliaá 
 Length: 
 Date: March 2013 – March 2016
 Miles walked per month: 
 Details: Nicknamed “Nacho Dean,” Mouliaá walked across several continents to raise awareness for environmental causes. Leaving his native Spain, he traveled through 31 countries, pushing some food and supplies on a trekking tricycle. He survived violent attacks in Mexico, Peru and El Salvador, as well as a dog bite in Honduras.

George Meegan 
 Length: 
 Date: January 1977 – September 1983
 Miles walked per month: 
 Details: George Meegan, a British adventurer and former Merchant Navy seaman, hiked across two continents, from the southern tip of South America at Tierra Del Fuego to the northernmost part of Alaska. He said he made the walk as a “celebration of freedom” and because he wasn't aware of anyone completing such a continuous journey along the two continents before. A few months into the project, he married Yoshiko Matsumoto of Japan in Argentina, and she accompanied him on part of the way. She returned to Japan twice to have their children, and the family traveled to be with him for the final leg.

Konstantin Rengarten
 Length: 
 Date: August 1894 – September 1898
 Miles walked per month: 
 Details: The highly educated Russian spent a decade preparing for what some believe was the first true walk around the world. Starting from Riga, he paid his own way and didn't claim to be lured by a bet or dare, as some world walkers did. His route included South Russia, Iran, Armenia, Siberia, Mongolia, Japan, the US, France and Germany. He wrote regular reports to newspapers and didn't change his story.

Steven Newman 
 Length: 
 Date: April 1983 – April 1987
 Miles walked per month: 
 Details: Journalist Steven M. Newman crossed 21 countries on a four-year solo walk. His motive was a “deep urge to find out if (the world) was really such a terrible place as everybody was saying.” He concluded that it wasn't, even though he was arrested several times, attacked by bandits and a drunken construction worker, and had to fend off wild boars and other creatures.

David Kunst 
 Length: 
 Date: June 1970 – October 1974
 Miles walked per month: 
 Details: With a mule and hero send-off, brothers John and David Kunst started walking from Minnesota to New York and then through Europe, with a goal of completing the first verified walk around the Earth. They also raised funds for UNICEF, although some questioned whether that had a pure motive. In Afghanistan, they were attacked by bandits, and John was shot and killed. David was also shot but survived by acting like he was dead. After returning to Minnesota for a few months to recuperate, David continued with another brother, Peter, from the point where John had died. They were denied access to the Soviet Union and China, and southeast Asia was wracked with war. So they flew from India to Australia. Peter left the project after developing leg problems, so David walked alone with a mule, which died, causing him to have to push supplies with a cart. An Australian teacher aided him, and he later married her, even though he had three children with a Minnesota woman who supported his walk. Guinness World Records cited his accomplishment as the “first verified achievement” of circumnavigating the planet.

Prem Kumar 
 Length: 
 Date: October 1982 – August 1986
 Miles walked per month: 
 Details: As founder of social service organizations in India, Prem Kumar walked to raise awareness for peace and development in poorer countries. He then organised walks in India involving participants from other countries.

Timothy John Michael Adams "Protest Walk"
 Length: approximately 
 Date: Jun 2022 - Jan 2023
 Miles walked per month: 
 Details: In protest of his illegal 7 month long detainment in central North Carolina without access to a lawyer. Timothy walked daily for upwards of 15 hours averaging 3 mph. Timothy was kidnapped by an assaulting police officer in front of his home during an evening stroll and charged with obstructing traffic, resisiting arrest, and assault on an officer, of which the arrest records were deleted, and police dropping the charges. However, leaving Timothy behind bars for 7 months. It is believe Timothy was targeted for being sympathetic to human rights movements and for having an intense concern for the safety of fellow friends who also went missing around the same time.  This walk in protest was end capping, an already long walk Timothy started two years prior, estimated to be approzimately 30,000 miles over 3 years for which he plans to write a novel called "Ramble and Bars" to document his experience, situation willing.  References on this incident will be made when time permitting, as this event is still rather recent and is still developing.

Louis Michael Figueroa 
 Length: 
 Date: January 2005 – June 2005, June 2010 – January 2011
 Miles walked per month: 
 Details: Walking for victims of child abuse in January 2005, Figueroa was forced to stop after six months due to legal issues and complications from leukemia. He started again in 2010 and finished the circumference route around the US in Tucson, Arizona. In 1982, Figueroa ran across the country in just 60 days to raise funds for cancer victims. He walked across the country to raise funds for AIDS victims in 1996.

Avdhesh Sharma (IND) 
 Length: 
 Date: 21 April 2021 – 26 August 2021
 1st one to walk from Atal Tunnel
 On 15 August 2021 -  walked 75 km
 Details: Avdhesh born in a small town of Uttar Pradesh, Kosi Kalan(Mathura). In his 104 Hiking days of L2K Hike (Ladakh to Kanyakumari on foot) he walked around 4200 km passing through 11 States and 3 UT's (Ladakh, HP, Punjab, Chandigarh, Haryana, Delhi, UP, Rajasthan, MP, Maharashtra, Telangana, AP, Karnataka and TN). He is the 1st one to hike from Thang, Ladakh (The northern most village of India) to Cape Comorin, Kanyakumari, Tamil Nadu. During L2K Hike he spread the awareness for RGBforLife - (R)ed for Blood Donation, (G)reen for Save Environment and (B)lue for Save Water.

Longest runs, wheelchair expeditions

Tony Mangan 
 Length: 
 Date: October 2010 – October 2014
 Miles run per month: 
 Details: Beginning in his native Ireland, distance runner Tony Mangan jogged through North America, Central and South America, Australia, Asia and Europe, raising funds for a charity that battled depression. He ran with a stroller named Nirvana, which carried a tent, clothes, food, and other belongings. .

Robert Garside 
 Length: 
 Date: October 1997 – June 2003
 Miles run per month: 
 Details: British runner Robert Garside was cited by Guinness World Records as being the first person to run around the world. He started in India and jogged through Tibet, China, Japan, Australia, South America, Mexico, the US, Africa, Turkey and back to India. He had considerable corporate sponsors and met his future wife in Venezuela. He got mugged twice at gunpoint and was jailed in China.

Rick Hansen 
 Length: 
 Date: March 1985 – May 1987
 Miles wheeled per month: 
 Details: Canadian wheelchair athlete Rick Hansen pushed his way through 34 countries on four continents. He wheeled on the Great Wall of China and met Pope John Paul II at the Vatican. He wore out 160 tires and was robbed four times. The project raised $26 million for spinal cord injury research.

References 

Walking
Hiking
Charity
Running
Travel
Physical fitness
Adventure